Arasvikfjord or Arasvikfjorden is a fjord in Møre og Romsdal and Trøndelag counties in Norway. The fjord is located between Aure Municipality (in Møre og Romsdal) and Heim Municipality (in Trøndelag). The fjord is part of the larger Vinjefjorden, near where the Valsøyfjorden branches off to the south. European route E39 runs along the south shore of the fjord, through the village of Valsøyfjord. The ferry from Hennset to Arasvika crosses the fjord. The Arasvikfjorden is known for its fishery of cod, coalfish, pollock, mackerel, common ling, tusk, and several types of flatfish.

It was in Arasvikfjord that the famous killer whale Keiko, from the movie Free Willy, spent his final days.

See also
 List of Norwegian fjords

References

Heim, Norway
Aure, Norway
Fjords of Trøndelag
Fjords of Møre og Romsdal